Rani Petersen (born 24 November 1997), known professionally as Reiley, is a Faroese singer and social media influencer. He is scheduled to represent Denmark in the Eurovision Song Contest 2023 with the song "Breaking My Heart".

Career

Melodi Grand Prix and Eurovision
Reiley was announced as one of the competitors of the Melodi Grand Prix 2023, the Danish national selection for the Eurovision Song Contest 2023, with the song "Breaking My Heart". However, he was at risk of disqualification from the competition after it was discovered that he performed the song at the "Slow Life Slow Live" festival in Seoul, South Korea in 2022, a violation of the competition's rules. Despite this, it was later confirmed that he would not be disqualified and would compete. He later went on to win the competition and subsequently became the Danish representative. He is the first person from the Faroe Islands to represent Denmark at Eurovision.

Discography

EP 

 BRB, Having an Identity Crisis (2021)

Singles 

 "Let It Ring" (2021)
 "Superman" (2021)
 "Blah Blah Blah"
 "Moonlight" with AB6IX (2022)
 "Breaking My Heart" (2023)

References

External links

Living people
Faroese male singers
Eurovision Song Contest entrants of 2023
People from Tórshavn
Eurovision Song Contest entrants for Denmark
Atlantic Records artists
1997 births